Stibarsen or allemontite is a natural form of arsenic antimonide (AsSb) or antimony arsenide (SbAs). The name stibarsen is derived from Latin stibium (antimony) and arsenic, whereas allemonite refers to the locality Allemont in France where the mineral was discovered. It is found in veins at Allemont, Isère, France; Valtellina, Italy; and the Comstock Lode, Nevada; and in a lithium pegmatites at Varuträsk, Sweden. Stibarsen is often mixed with pure arsenic or antimony, and the original description in 1941 proposed to use stibarsen for AsSb and allemontite for the mixtures. Since 1982, the International Mineralogical Association considers stibarsen as the correct mineral name.

Structure

Stibarsen has the same crystal structure as arsenic and antimony, with the intermediate values of the lattice parameters. This structure (space group Rm No. 166) is variably described as hexagonal, trigonal and rhombohedral because of the overlap between these terms (see trigonal crystal system). Simulation of the X-ray diffraction intensities reveals that the Sb and As atoms form ordered (or partly ordered) sublattices in SbAs. The atoms are arranged in warped graphite-like sheets, which extend normal to the c axis. Weak bonding between the sheets accounts for the relatively low hardness of As, Sb and AsSb.

References

Arsenic minerals
Trigonal minerals
Minerals in space group 166
Native element minerals
Antimonide minerals